The Sri Lankan national cricket team toured Australia in July 2004, well outside the normal Australian cricket season. Two Test matches were played, Australia winning the series 1–0.

Test series

1st Test

2nd Test

External links
 CricketArchive

2004 in Sri Lankan cricket
2004 in Australian cricket
2004
International cricket competitions in 2004
Sri Lankan cricket seasons from 2000–01